better known by this nickname Kazunoko (かずのこ), is a Japanese fighting games player known for playing Holy Order Sol in Guilty Gear XX Accent Core Plus R, Yun in Street Fighter IV,  Cammy in Street Fighter V, Yamcha in Dragon Ball FighterZ and Raven in Guilty Gear Xrd: Revelator. He was the winner of Ultra Street Fighter IV at Capcom Cup 2015 where he beat Daigo Umehara in the grand finals. He joined Zeveron in July 2015. However Zeveron went out of business the following months and they failed to pay him, resulting in him being a free agent.

In 2015 Kazunoko also won CEO and placed second at Canada Cup. He got 9th at EVO 2015. At Capcom Cup 2015 he went through the bracket undefeated, with wins over Gustavo "801 Strider" Romero, Benjamin "Problem X" Simon, Du "NuckleDu" Dang, Lee "Infiltration" Seon-woo, Daigo Umehara, and finally a 3–2 victory over Daigo again in the grand finals.

In 2018–19, Kazunoko participated in and dominated the inaugural Dragon Ball FighterZ World Tour by winning four of the seven official DBFZ events. He became the Dragon Ball FighterZ world champion in 2019 by winning the first Red Bull Final Summoning

Tournament results

Super Street Fighter IV: Arcade Edition v2012
  Canada Cup 2013 - 3rd
 EVO 2013 - 13th

Ultra Street Fighter IV
 EVO 2014 - 13th
 Tokyo Game Show 2014 - 5th
 Community Effort Orlando (CEO) 2015 - 1st 
 Tokaigi - Game Party Japan 2015 - 1st
 SXSW Gaming Expo 2015 - 2nd
 Shadowloo Showdown 6 - 2nd
 Canada Cup Master Series 2015	- 2nd
 South East Asia Major 2015 - 4th
 KVO x TSB 2015 - 4th
 Arcade Stream 2015 - 4th
 Final Round 18 - 4th
 NorCal Regionals 2015 - 7th
 EVO 2015 - 9th
 Tokyo Game Show 2015 - 13th
 Stunfest 2015 - 13th
 Capcom Cup 2015 - 1st

Street Fighter V
 EVO 2016 - 9th
 Capcom Cup 2016 - 3rd
 EVO 2017 - 3rd
 EVO 2019 - 33rd

Guilty Gear Xrd -SIGN-
 Canada Cup Master Series 2015	- 1st
 Vancouver Street Battle - 1st
 Shadowloo Showdown 6 - 1st
 Final Round 18 - 1st
 NorCal Regionals 2015 - 1st
 Double Elimination 2015 - 1st
 Stunfest 2015 - 1st
 South East Asia Major 2015 - 2nd
 Community Effort Orlando (CEO) 2015 - 1st
 SoCal Regionals 2015 - 1st
 CEOtaku - 2nd
 Canada Cup 2015 - 1st

Guilty Gear Xrd -REVELATOR-
CEO 2016 - 2nd
EVO 2016 - 5th

Guilty Gear Xrd -REVELATOR 2-
EVO 2017 - 5th
Evo Japan 2018 - 3rd
Stunfest 2018 - 1st

Guilty Gear XX Accent Core
 CEOTaku - 1st

Dragon Ball FighterZ
 CEO 2018 - 1st
 SEA Major 2018 - 1st
 Japan Saga 2018 - 1st
 CouchWarriors Crossup Major 2018 - 1st
 Red Bull Final Summoning DBFZ World Tour Finals - 1st
 EVO 2019 - 7th
 National Championship Japan Playoffs 2020 - 1st

References

External links
 

Living people
Fighting game players
Japanese esports players
Street Fighter players
Year of birth missing (living people)